Bedard Aspen Provincial Park is a provincial park in British Columbia, Canada, located in the Cornwall Hills to the west of Cache Creek-Ashcroft in that province's Thompson Country region.  The valley of Hat Creek is to its west.

See also
Cornwall Hills Park
Blue Earth Lake Provincial Park

References

BC Parks infopage

Provincial parks of British Columbia
Thompson Country
Year of establishment missing